Panagiotis Giannopoulos (born 25 September 1972) is a Greek former professional footballer who played as a left-back.

References

1972 births
Living people
Association football defenders
Greek expatriate footballers
Greek expatriate sportspeople in Italy
Greek expatriate sportspeople in Romania
Expatriate footballers in Italy
Expatriate footballers in Romania
Serie A players
Serie B players
Liga I players
Aris Thessaloniki F.C. players
Panionios F.C. players
Venezia F.C. players
FC Argeș Pitești players
Footballers from Piraeus
Greek footballers